Dominican High School is a private,  Catholic high school in Whitefish Bay, Wisconsin, United States.  It is in, but not funded by, the Archdiocese of Milwaukee as a college preparatory high school.

Background
Father Samuel Mazzuchelli, O.P. (1809–1864), an Italian native who preached and established churches throughout Michigan, Wisconsin, Illinois and Iowa, founded the Sinsinawa Dominican Congregation of the Most Holy Rosary. This congregation  served as the foundation for Dominican High School.

Dominican High School opened in September 1956, with 174 freshmen from 26 parishes. Although sponsored by the Sinsinawa Dominicans, the school was championed by two pastors, Peter E. Dietz, pastor of St. Monica Parish (1912–1947) and Farrell P. Reilly, pastor of St. Robert Parish (1912–1958). Both envisioned the formation of a Catholic high school in the North Shore suburbs. St. Monica Parish donated the land for Dominican High School and St. Robert Parish contributed over half a million dollars for its construction.

Notable alumni
Alex Antetokounmpo – NBA G League player
 Kostas Antetokounmpo – NBA player
 Jay Guidinger – NBA player
 Anthony Pettis – professional mixed martial artist, former WEC Lightweight Champion, former UFC Lightweight Champion
 Diamond Stone – NBA player

References

External links
 Dominican High School website
 Student newspaper website

Roman Catholic Archdiocese of Milwaukee
Catholic secondary schools in Wisconsin
Schools in Milwaukee County, Wisconsin
Educational institutions established in 1956
1956 establishments in Wisconsin
Dominican schools in the United States